Star King is a science fiction novel written by Jack Vance.

Star King may also refer to:

Star King (TV series), a South Korean series which aired from 2007 to 2016
The Star Kings, a 1949 Edmond Hamilton science fiction novel
Star Kingdom (1946–1967), a Thoroughbred race horse formerly known as Star King